is a Japanese professional shogi player, ranked 9-dan. He is a former director of the Japanese Shogi Association, and is currently serving as an executive director.

Early life
Taku Morishita was born in Kokura, Kitakyushu on July 10, 1966. In September 1978, he entered the Japan Shogi Association's apprentice school at the rank of 6-kyū under guidance of shogi professional . He was promoted to the 1-dan in June 1981, and obtained professional status and the rank of 4-dan in September 1983.

Shogi professional
In 1985, Morishita advanced to the championship match of the 16th  tournament, but lost to Keita Inoue 2 games to 1. Five years later in October 1990, Morishita faced  in the championship match of 21st Shinjin-Ō tournament, winning 2 games to 1 for his first tournament championship as a professional. The following year, Morishita met Toshiyuki Moriuchi in the championship match of the 22nd Shinjin-Ō tournament, but lost 2 games to none.

Morishita made his first appearance in a major title match in 1990 when he challenged Nobuyuki Yashiki for the 57th Kisei title, but lost the match 3 games to 1.

In 1991, Morishita earned the right to challenge Koji Tanigawa for the 4th Ryūō title. Game 1 was played in Bangkok and ended in impasse. The match was tied at two wins apiece after five games, but Tanigawa won the next two games to defend his title 4 games to 2.

In 1995, Morishita was the challenger for the 53rd Meijin title against Yoshiharu Habu, but Habu successfully defended his title 4 games to 1.

In 2007, Morishita defeated Moriuchi to win the 28th  tournament. The following year he defeated Kōichi Fukaura to win the 29th Nihon Series tournament and repeat as champion.

In August 2010, Morishita defeated Takeshi Kawakami in a preliminary round game of the 4th  tournament to become the fourteenth professional shogi player to win 800 official games.

Promotion history
The promotion history for Morishita is as follows:
 6-kyū: 1978
 1-dan: 1981
 4-dan: September 21, 1983
 5-dan: January 14, 1987
 6-dan: October 3, 1989
 7-dan: July 10, 1992
 8-dan: April 1, 1994
 9-dan: December 12, 2003

Titles and other championships
Morishita has appeared in major title matches a total of six times, but has not won any major titles. He has, however, won eight non-major shogi championships during his career.

Awards and honors
Morishita has received a number of awards and honors throughout his career for his accomplishments both on an off the shogi board. These include the Annual Shogi Awards given out by the JSA for performance in official games as well as other JSA awards for career accomplishments.

Annual Shogi Awards
15th Annual Awards (April 1987March 1988): Best New Player
17th Annual Awards (April 1989March 1990): Fighting-spirit
18th Annual Awards (April 1990March 1991): Best Winning Percentage, Most Games Won, Most Games Played, Distinguished Service Award
19th Annual Awards (April 1991March 1992): Technique Award
22nd Annual Awards (April 1994March 1995): Technique Award

Other awards
2000: Shogi Honor Fighting-spirit Award (Awarded by JSA in recognition of winning 600 official games as a professional)
2008: 25 Years Service Award (Awarded by the JSA in recognition of being an active professional for twenty-five years)
2010: Shogi Honor Fighting-spirit Award (Awarded by JSA in recognition of winning 800 official games as a professional)

Year-end prize money and game fee ranking
Morishita has finished in the "Top 10" of the JSA's  a number of times since 1993.

Note: All amounts are given in Japanese yen and include prize money and fees earned from official tournaments and games held from January 1 to December 31.

JSA director
Morishita was elected to the Japan Shogi Association's board of directors as a director at the association's 56th General Meeting for a two-year term on May 26, 2005.

He was elected to the board once again in May 2017 as an executive director, and then re-elected for another two-year term in June 2019.

References

External links
ShogiHub: Professional Player Info · Morishita, Taku

1966 births
Japanese shogi players
Living people
Professional shogi players
People from Kitakyushu
Professional shogi players from Fukuoka Prefecture
Recipients of the Kōzō Masuda Award
Shinjin-Ō